Masefield may refer to:
Places
 Masefield, Saskatchewan
People
 John Masefield (1878-1967), English poet
 Paul Masefield (b. 1970), English footballer